Charles Winston Hancock (September 15, 1902 – July 9, 1974) was an American Negro league catcher in the 1920s.

A native of Lexington, Missouri, Hancock was the brother of fellow Negro leaguer Art Hancock. He played for the St. Louis Giants in 1921, and for the Chicago American Giants in 1928. Hancock died in Sioux City, Iowa in 1974 at age 71.

References

External links
 and Seamheads

1902 births
1974 deaths
Chicago American Giants players
St. Louis Giants players
People from Lexington, Missouri
Baseball catchers
Baseball players from Missouri